Trapeza, Crete is a Neolithic and Bronze Age sacred cave on the island of Crete in Greece.  Some of the Bronze Age pottery finds at Trapeza are similar to specimens recovered at Knossos and Vasiliki.

It is described as a "burial cave", and sometimes called the "table of Minos" (trapeza meaning table in Greek).

See also
Minoan civilization

References

Minoan sites in Crete
Neolithic settlements in Crete
Ancient caves of Greece
Sacred caves